Kedar Naphade (born January 10, 1972) is an Indian classical harmonium player.

Early life
Kedar Naphade was born into a Maharashtrian family in the city of Mumbai, India. His father, Sudheer Naphade is a professional in the Merchant Navy and was the Nautical Advisor to the Government of India. His mother Pushpalata Naphade is a physician. He grew up in a traditional middle-class environment in a suburb of Mumbai. He received initial music education and training in the harmonium from his grandfather Dadasaheb Naphade and from Arvind Gajendragadkar. Since 1980, from the age of 8, he started learning harmonium solo and accompaniment from Tulsidas Borkar. He was also closely associated with and learnt from Padmavati Shaligram-Gokhale of the Jaipur-Atrauli gharana from 1989–1993.

He finished his engineering degree at the Indian Institute of Technology in Mumbai in 1993. Subsequently he relocated to the United States of America, where he finished his Ph.D. in Operations Research from Lehigh University in 1997.

Career
Kedar has been performing harmonium solo and accompaniment concerts since 1982.  He was featured as a child artist on the Mumbai Television Channel Doordarshan in the early 1980s and started performing professionally as a soloist and accompanist of Hindustani Classical music in 1990, at the age of 18. He first came into limelight with a concert at the prestigious Annual Alladiya Khan Smruti Samaroha in Mumbai, India with Smt. Padmavati Shaligram-Gokhalie in 1992.

Kedar's music is based on that of Tulshidas Borkar and P. Madhukar. In addition to classical music, Kedar also plays the semi-classical forms of Marathi Natyasangeet (Stage Music), bhajans, and thumri.

Kedar has performed harmonium solo and has accompanied vocalists at numerous concerts in India, Europe and in the U.S.  He has more than 500 concert appearances to his credit, including prestigious festivals and venues such as the Alladiya Khan Smruti Samaroha, Dadar Matunga Cultural Center and Vile Parle Music Circle in Mumbai, Surel Samvadini Sanvardhan institute in Belgaum, Karnataka,  Kala Academy in Panaji Goa, Bharat Natya Mandir in Pune, India, the London U.K. Marathi Mandal,  The Lincoln Center in New York, Carnegie Hall in New York, The Smithsonian Institution in Washington D.C., the LearnQuest Academy music conference in Boston, the Chhandayan Annual All  Night  Music Conference in New York etc.

He has also been featured on radio stations such as the National Public Radio, WKCR 89.9, e-Prasaran Internet radio etc. 
He has collaborated on stage with legendary musicians of India such as his guru Smt. Padmavati Shaligram-Gokhale, Pt. Jasraj, Smt. Veena Sahasrabuddhe, Pt. Ulhas Kashalkar, Smt. Prabha Atre, Smt. Laxmi Shankar, Pt. Phiroz Dastur, Smt. Ashwini Bhide-Deshpande, etc.

He has also collaborated with other instrumentalists and worked in instrumental ensembles with other instruments such as the sitar, flute, violin and mandolin.

Kedar started teaching the harmonium under Ace Open University in 2010.

Awards and recognitions
Swar Sadhana Samiti young artist award (1983, 1984)

References

External links
Official website
Podcast featuring Kedar Naphade originally broadcast on WKCR 89.9 FM-NY

Harmonium players
1972 births
Hindustani instrumentalists
Living people